The chair of the Professor of Anatomy at the University of Cambridge was founded by the university in 1707. In 1924, the scope of the professorship was extended from purely human anatomy to cover the anatomy of all vertebrates, as well as embryology.

Professors of Anatomy

References

Anatomy
Faculty of Biology, University of Cambridge
1707 establishments in Great Britain
Anatomy, *, Cambridge
 
Professorships in biology